Alicia and Annie Sorell are identical twin actresses. Since 2002, Alicia has been credited as Alicia Lorén.

Their joint credits include the films Cruel Intentions 2 and Santa's Slay, and the television shows George Lopez and October Road. They also wrote and starred in Movie Twins, a series of shorts produced by Sí TV about currently showing films.

Filmography

References

External links
 
 
 
 

Year of birth missing (living people)
Living people
American film actresses
Identical twin actresses
American twins
21st-century American women